Lagocheirus foveolatus is a species of longhorn beetles of the subfamily Lamiinae. It was described by Dillon in 1957, and is known from Panama.

References

Beetles described in 1957
Endemic fauna of Panama
Lagocheirus